Javier Antonio Orozco Peñuelas (born 16 November 1987) is a Mexican former professional footballer who played as a forward. He is popularly known by his nickname "Chuletita".

Club career
Orozco made his debut on September 17, 2005, against Tigres, a game which resulted in a 1–2 victory for Cruz Azul. In the 2010 Apertura, he scored the first goal of the season, and currently leads the season with 6 goals. He scored 4 goals and had an assist against Real Salt Lake of MLS to defeat them 5–4. He is also the top goalscorer in CONCACAF Champions League history, as he has netted 24 times.

On 8 June 2016, Jaguares made the signing of Chuletita official for the Apertura 2016.

International career
Orozco got his first call-up by interim coach Efraín Flores for friendly matches on September 4 and 7, 2010, against Ecuador and Colombia, respectively. He started for the first time on October 12, against Venezuela. In 2015 he was called up to represent  Mexico in the 2015 CONCACAF Gold Cup after Javier Hernández suffered an injury in a friendly before the tournament, Mexico later went on to win that tournament

Personal life
Javier Orozco is the son of Luis Antonio Orozco who played in Atletico Tecoman and Irapuato FC in the 1980s and also is brother to Luis Orozco that plays for Club Tijuana who is also a striker.
Orozco is nicknamed "Chuletita" (little pork-chop). The nickname comes from his father, Luis Antonio Orozco, who earned the moniker "Chuleta" when he was six years old, by his father, who would tell him "vete por las chuletas" — a Mexican slang saying which roughly translates to "go get the money."

Honours
Cruz Azul
Copa MX: Clausura 2013

Santos Laguna
Copa MX: Apertura 2014
Liga MX: Clausura 2015 
Campeon de Campeones: 2015

Mexico
CONCACAF Gold Cup: 2015

Individual
CONCACAF Champions League Golden Boot: 2008-09, 2010-11
Copa Santander Libertadores 2012: Player of the Week (Week 3)

Career statistics

Club
As of 28 February 2016

International

References

External links

1987 births
Living people
Footballers from Sinaloa
Sportspeople from Los Mochis
Cruz Azul footballers
Liga MX players
Santos Laguna footballers
Chiapas F.C. footballers
C.D. Veracruz footballers
Mexico international footballers
2013 CONCACAF Gold Cup players
2015 CONCACAF Gold Cup players
CONCACAF Gold Cup-winning players
Mexican footballers
Association football forwards